Félix Fructuoso Sienra Castellanos (21 January 1916 – 30 January 2023) was a Uruguayan sailor who competed in the 1948 Summer Olympics finishing sixth. Sienra turned 100 in January 2016, and died on 30 January 2023, at the age of 107. According to Paul Tchir, prior to his death in 2023, he was the oldest known living Olympic athlete.

See also
 List of centenarians (sportspeople)

References

External links
 

1916 births
2023 deaths
Uruguayan male sailors (sport)
Olympic sailors of Uruguay
Sailors at the 1948 Summer Olympics – Firefly
Uruguayan centenarians
Men centenarians
Sportspeople from Montevideo